Ernietta is an extinct genus of Ediacaran organisms with an infaunal lifestyle. Fossil preservations and modeling indicate this organism was sessile and “sack”-shaped. It survived partly buried in substrate, with an upturned bell-shaped frill exposed above the sediment-water interface. Ernietta have been recovered from present-day Namibia, and are a part of the Ediacaran biota, a late Proterozoic radiation of multicellular organisms. They are among the earliest complex multicellular organisms and are known from the late Ediacaran (ca. 548 Ma to 541 Ma). Ernietta plateauensis remains the sole species of the genus.

Biology and paleoecology 
Fossil specimens show individuals to have lived partly buried in the substrate, as well as filled to some degree by substrate material. An exposed frill extended out of the substrate and was thought to have conducted feeding in the water column. Modeling based on fossil specimens show that the frill possessed an “upturned bell” shape. Water and nutrients circulated within this bell cavity, and the organism is thought to have engaged in suspension feeding. It is possible that appendages which carried out feeding were not preserved in fossils. Previously, Ernietta were thought to have obtained nutrients by passive absorption, however, this is currently unsupported given the high volume to surface area ratio observed in Ernietta. Alternatively Ernietta may have lived from associated symbiotic algae.

Hydrodynamic modeling carried out by Gibson et al. in 2019 assumed that Ernietta inhabited shallow marine environments in aggregations. Nutrient delivery was found to be optimized when individuals were situated in “clumped” formations, with multiple individuals aggregated in groups located upstream or downstream from one another. This formation enhanced both vertical mixing and the direction of nutrient-rich currents to the bodies of downstream individuals. This may thus be one of the earliest examples of commensalism, in which organisms act to mutual benefit. 

The body of Ernietta is composed of a layer of tubes (with some preservations indicating a double-layer of tubes).  Perpendicular to these tubes is an equatorial seam. The body is asymmetrical along either side of this seam. The presence of this seam and offset symmetry unites the Ernettiomorpha, which includes taxa more similar to Ernietta (for example, Pteridinium, Swartpuntia, and Mietta) than to the rangeomorphs.

Ernietta has been considered a benthic shallow marine fossil comparable with an anemone. However Gregory Retallack, researcher who supports theory that Ediacaran biota like Dickinsonia being lichens, claimed that there is evidence for freshwater environments from its low boron content compared with other Ediacaran fossils. His study also shows that specimens have been found covered with thin layers of wind-drift sand of alluvial levees.

Biogeography 
All occurrences of Ernietta are known from the Nama Group (specifically, the Kuibis and Schwarzrand subgroups) of present-day Namibia. The Nama Group consists of fluvial and shallow marine sediments that span the Ediacaran to the Cambrian (approximately spanning from 570 to 543 Ma). Formations of the Nama Group outcrop across southern Namibia. Most specimens of Ernietta are preserved in sandstones, with a single occurrence in a siltstone. Fossils of the Aar Member of the Nama Group in particular are preserved within beds of cross-stratified sandstones. A significant discovery of this taxon was reported in 2016, at the Farm Aar field site in southern Namibia, which recovered a number of specimens preserved in life position in the water column. This depositional environment of this site has been interpreted as subtidal, with periodic influxes of storm-induced sands. 

Other reports of Ernietta exist outside Namibia, including Nevada, USA  An occurrence in the Windermere group of British Columbia, Canada has not yet been described.

Taxonomy, history and preservational forms 

Ediacaran fossils are difficult to assign to taxonomic classifications based on modern organisms, as they have no living representatives. Ernietta is the type genus for the clade Ernettiomorpha. As a whole, the Ediacaran biota have been variously defined as early marine animals, cnidarians, lichens, bacterial colonies, or an intermediate between plants and animals. 

The Ernietta genus contains a sole species: Ernietta plateauensis. This species is the type species of the Ernettiomorpha and was first described in 1966 by Pflug. In 1972, Pflug described a large number of new fossils which he placed into 13 genera and 29 species, all of which were later synonymized and united in a single species, Ernietta plateauensis. These synonymized taxa include: 
Ernietta tschanabis Phlug, 1972 
E. aarensis Phlug, 1972
Erniaster aportus Phlug, 1972
E. patellus Phlug, 1972
Erniobaris baroides Phlug, 1972
E. epistuta Phlug, 1972
E. gula Phlug, 1972
E. parietalis Phlug, 1972
Erniobeta forensis Phlug, 1972
E. scapulosa Phlug, 1972
Erniocarpis sermo Phlug, 1972
Erntocentris centriformis Phlug, 1972
Erniodiscus clypeus Phlug, 1972
E. rutilus Phlug, 1972
Erniofossa prognatha Phlug, 1972
Erniograndis paraglossa Phlug, 1972
E. sandalix Phlug, 1972
Ernionorma abyssoides Phlug, 1972
E. clausula Phlug, 1972
E. peltis Phlug, 1972
E. rector Phlug, 1972
E. tribunalis Phlug, 1972
Erniopelta scruputa Phlug, 1972
Erniotaxls segmontrix Phlug, 1972

See also 

 List of Ediacaran genera
Ediacaran biota
Ediacaran
Geology of Namibia

References

Further reading 
 Life on a Young Planet: The First Three Billion Years of Evolution on Earth (Princeton Science Library) by Andrew H. Knoll  
 Exceptional Fossil Preservation by David J. Bottjer, Walter Etter, James W. Hagadorn, and Carol M. Tang 
 The Ecology of the Cambrian Radiation by Andrey Zhuravlev and Robert Riding

Ediacaran life
Prehistoric animal genera
Enigmatic animal taxa
Precambrian Africa
Fossils of Namibia
Fossil taxa described in 1966